Harvey Hall (27 June 1931 – 11 April 1997) was an English television actor. He appeared in many British television series and films, which include Danger Man, Z-Cars, The Masque of the Red Death, Zulu, No Hiding Place, The Avengers, Out of the Unknown, The Champions, The Vampire Lovers, Lust for a Vampire and others.

In the 1970s he worked as an English teacher at St John's School in Leatherhead and Charterhouse School in Godalming, Surrey. He also produced and directed many plays.

Acting credits

References

External links

1931 births
1997 deaths
English male television actors
People from St Columb Minor
Schoolteachers from Surrey